Esmailabad Rural District may refer to:

Esmailabad Rural District (Sistan and Baluchestan Province)
Esmailabad Rural District (Baharestan County), Tehran province